Walter Germán Bracamonte (born 22 July 1997) is an Argentine footballer who plays as a winger for Greek Gamma Ethniki club Iraklis Larissa.

Career

Club career
After spells at Unión Santa Fe and Alvarado in Argentina, Bracamonte joined Greek club Asteras Vlachioti on 15 January 2021. In October 2021, Bracamonte moved to Gamma Ethniki club Aetos Makrychori. In January 2022, he joined fellow league club Iraklis Larissa.

References

External links
Walter Bracamonte at Super Sports

1997 births
Living people
Argentine footballers
Argentine expatriate footballers
Association football wingers
Sportspeople from Córdoba Province, Argentina
Unión de Santa Fe footballers
Club Atlético Alvarado players
Argentine Primera División players
Primera Nacional players
Gamma Ethniki players
Argentine expatriate sportspeople in Greece
Expatriate footballers in Greece